Sheboygan County Sheriff's Office is the principal law enforcement agency that serves Sheboygan County, Wisconsin. The current Sheriff is Cory Roeseler, who was elected to his first term in office in 2018.

History 
Sheboygan County, located on the western shores of Lake Michigan, was first established on December 17, 1838, two years after the area was detached from Brown County by an act of territorial legislation. Today's boundaries of the county are still those established in 1838. The Sheboygan County Sheriff's Office was established in 1846 and T.C. Horner was the first Sheriff elected.
 
The Sheriff's Office was once located inside the David Taylor House, which still stands today in the same location as a part of the Sheboygan County Historical Museum. The jail was located in the basement of the David Taylor House from 1915 to 1936 while the Sheriff's Office was located on the first floor and the Sheriff's residence on the second floor.
 
In 1936, the Sheriff's Office and county jail moved to the top floor of the Sheboygan County Courthouse.
 
In 1981, the Sheboygan County Sheriff's Office relocated to its present location inside the Law Enforcement Center at 525 North 6th Street in Sheboygan. At the time, it was a very contemporary linear facility with modern security systems. The second floor of the Sheriff's Office served as the county jail until 1998 when a 95,000 square foot, 295 bed Detention Center was constructed on the city's south side. It was envisioned the Sheriff's Office and the Sheboygan Police Department would be housed inside the Law Enforcement Center but that never occurred.
 
In 2012, after years of discussion, the Sheboygan County and City of Sheboygan approved an agreement to combine emergency dispatch at the Law Enforcement Center. Under the proposal, the city will fund remodeling of the new center by providing $2.5 million for the project. The Joint Dispatch Center began operation in 2016.

Divisions

Patrol 
The Sheboygan County Sheriff's Office is responsible for the safety and security of Sheboygan County's fifteen townships, eight villages, as well as 1,087 miles of roadway. The duties of the Patrol Division include investigations of criminal and civil complaints, enforcement of traffic laws, investigate traffic crashes, crime prevention, and public relations.

The patrol division provides contract patrol to the villages of Oostburg, Cedar Grove, Random Lake, Howards Grove, and Glenbeulah, as well as the Town of Holland.

Criminal Investigation 
The Criminal Investigation Division consists of a Lieutenant, Detective Sergeant, and seven detectives. The division's primary mission is to investigate time-consuming, complex or specialized crimes that are not practical for patrol deputies to investigate.

Correctional 
The Corrections Division is the largest division of the Sheboygan County Sheriff’s Office, and has been in existence in some form, since the inception of Sheriff’s Office. The Corrections Division operates the Sheboygan County Detention Center, located at 2923 South 31st Street and the Sheboygan County Juvenile Detention Center, located at 525 North 6th Street in Sheboygan. The division is made up of 54 correctional officers, 12 supervisors, one Huber Corporal and the Corrections Administrator.

Civil Process and Court Services 
The Sheboygan County Sheriff's Office Civil Process Division handles the service of legal papers pursuant to Wisconsin State Statute. The Court Services Division primary responsibilities are Sheboygan County Courthouse security and prisoner transportation. Five full-time and five part-time deputies are assigned to the Court Services Division. The Sheriff of each county is required by Wisconsin State Statute to be present in Circuit Courts.

Special teams 
The Sheboygan County Sheriff's Office offers specialized services to the community. Team members receive extensive specialized training in these areas. The specialized teams include; SWAT Team, Dive/Rescue Team, Drone Team, Hostage Negotiation Team, Crash Reconstruction, Bicycle Patrol, K-9 Patrol, Water Safety Patrol, Honor Guard, Correctional Emergency Response Team (CERT), and Gang Enforcement Team (GET).

Fallen officers 
Since the establishment of the Sheboygan County Sheriff Office, one officer has died in the line of duty.

See also 
 List of law enforcement agencies in Wisconsin

References

External links 
 Sheboygan County Sheriff's Office

Sheboygan County, Wisconsin
Sheriffs' offices of Wisconsin